The Polynesia slender treeskink (Emoia tongana) is a species of lizard in the family Scincidae. It is found in western Samoa and some northern Tongan islands.

References

Emoia
Reptiles described in 1899
Taxa named by Franz Werner